Cajan may refer to: Male personal name
 Cajuns, an ethnic group in Louisiana
 Cajans, an ethnic group in Alabama
 Cajan, a genus of legumes